Régis Tosatti Giacomin (born 16 January 1998), simply known as Régis, is a Brazilian professional footballer who plays as a forward.

Club career
Régis was born in Xanxerê, Santa Catarina, and represented Chapecoense as a youth. Ahead of the 2019 season, after being regularly used with the under-23 squad in the previous campaign, he was promoted to the first team.

Régis made his first team debut on 20 January 2019, coming on as a late substitute for Yann in a 0–0 Campeonato Catarinense away draw against Metropolitano. Rarely used by manager Claudinei Oliveira, he became a regular under new manager Ney Franco, making his first start on 21 April and scoring the opener in a 1–1 draw at Avaí, as his side lost the state league on penalties.

Régis made his Série A debut on starting in a 2–0 home success over Internacional.

References

External links
Chapecoense profile 

1998 births
Living people
Sportspeople from Santa Catarina (state)
Brazilian footballers
Association football forwards
Campeonato Brasileiro Série A players
Campeonato Brasileiro Série B players
UAE First Division League players
Super League Greece players
Associação Chapecoense de Futebol players
Esporte Clube Bahia players
Clube de Regatas Brasil players
Hatta Club players
Levadiakos F.C. players
Brazilian expatriate footballers
Expatriate footballers in the United Arab Emirates
Brazilian expatriate sportspeople in the United Arab Emirates
Expatriate footballers in Greece
Brazilian expatriate sportspeople in Greece